Sakari Paasonen (12 October 1935 – 7 November 2020) was a Finnish sport shooter.

He competed in pistol shooting events at the Summer Olympics in 1988 and 1992.

Olympic results

References

1935 births
2020 deaths
People from Mäntyharju
Finnish male sport shooters
ISSF pistol shooters
Shooters at the 1988 Summer Olympics
Shooters at the 1992 Summer Olympics
Olympic shooters of Finland
Sportspeople from South Savo